USS George P. Squires (SP-303) was United States Navy patrol vessel and minesweeper in commission from 1917 to 1918.

George P. Squires was built as a civilian fishing steamer of the same name in 1900 by Henry Brusster at Baltimore, Maryland. The U.S. Navy purchased her for World War I service as a patrol vessel and minesweeper from her owner, Bellows and Squires, Inc., of Ocran, Virginia, on 12 May 1917.  Bellows and Squires delivered her to the Navy on 21 May 1917, and she was commissioned the same day as USS George P. Squires (SP-303).

Assigned to the 5th Naval District, George P. Squires served as a harbor patrol boat at Norfolk, Virginia. In addition, she swept for naval mines in the defensive sea area of Chesapeake Bay and patrolled the Virginia coast off Cape Henry.

George P. Squires was decommissioned at Norfolk on 27 July 1918 and was sold to James Dietrich of New York City on 23 October 1918.

References

NavSource Online: Section Patrol Craft Photo Archive George P. Squires (SP 303)

Patrol vessels of the United States Navy
Minesweepers of the United States Navy
World War I patrol vessels of the United States
World War I minesweepers of the United States
Ships built in Baltimore
1900 ships